Axbridge is a small town in Somerset, England, in the Sedgemoor district on the River Axe, near the southern edge of the Mendip Hills. The town's population according to the 2011 census was 2,057.

History

Axanbrycg is suggested as the source of the name, meaning a bridge over the River Axe, in the early 9th century.

Early inhabitants of the area almost certainly include the Romans (who are known to have mined lead on the top of the Mendips) and earlier still, prehistoric man, who lived in the local caves, and whose flint tools have been found on the slopes of the local hills. The history of Axbridge can be traced back to the reign of King Alfred when it was part of the Saxons' defence system for Wessex against the Vikings. In the Burghal Hidage, a list of burhs compiled in 910, it was listed as Axanbrycg.

It was part of the royal manor of Cheddar and part of the Winterstoke Hundred.

It was granted a Royal Charter in 1202, when King John sold most of the royal manor of Cheddar to the Bishop of Bath and Wells. Axbridge grew in the Tudor period as a centre for cloth manufacture, This was reflected in its early royal charters allowing it to hold markets and fairs, and become a royal borough. It even had its own mint, with coins showing the town's symbol: the Lamb and Flag. Trade was possible as the River Axe was navigable to wharves at Axbridge.

Later the town's importance declined, which led to stagnation and the preservation of many historic buildings in the town centre. These include King John's Hunting Lodge (actually a Tudor building) which is now used as a museum.

Axbridge is a very old borough and sent members to parliament in the reigns of Edward I and Edward III.

During the 19th and early 20th centuries iron ore was extracted from the hill above and east of Axbridge.

Axbridge railway station, on the Cheddar Valley line, opened on 3 August 1869. It closed to goods traffic on 10 June 1963 and to passengers on 9 September 1963. The route of the railway is now the A371 Axbridge bypass, but the station buildings and goods shed still survive.

The Square was used as the setting for a NatWest Bank television advert in the early 1990s, and in particular Axbridge Town Hall doubled as a NatWest branch. Ironically a real branch of NatWest, in the High Street, was closed not long afterwards and the premises are now private residential accommodation. In 2017 several locations in the town were used for a Thatchers Cider television commercial, which featured a hot air balloon.

Governance

The town council (which is a parish council) has responsibility for local issues. The town council evaluates local planning applications and works with the local police, district council officers, and neighbourhood watch groups on matters of crime, security and traffic. The town council also initiates projects for the maintenance and repair of parish facilities, and consults with the district council on the maintenance, repair and improvement of highways, drainage, footpaths, public transport and street cleaning. Conservation matters (including trees and listed buildings) and environmental issues are also the responsibility of the council. Each year members of the town council elect a mayor for the town. Axbridge Town Council is based at Axbridge Town Hall.

The town falls within the non-metropolitan district of Sedgemoor, which was formed on 1 April 1974, under the Local Government Act 1972. It had been part of Axbridge Rural District from 1894 to 1974, which was responsible for local planning and building control, local roads, council housing, environmental health, markets and fairs, refuse collection and recycling, cemeteries and crematoria, leisure services, parks and tourism.

Somerset County Council is responsible for running the largest and most expensive local services such as education, social services, libraries, main roads, public transport, policing and fire services, trading standards, waste disposal and strategic planning.

The town is in Axevale electoral ward. Axbridge is the most populous area but the ward stretches south to Chapel Allerton. The total ward population as taken at the 2011 census is 4,261.

It is also part of the Wells county constituency represented in the House of Commons. It elects one MP by the first-past-the-post system of election.

Facilities

In 2012, The Roxy community cinema was reopened after a five-year renovation programme. This was aided by the Big Lottery Fund, and re-used old seats from the Colston Hall in Bristol. It has 32 seats and an art deco box office. The premises used to be the Axbridge Lion pub, a Georgian Grade II listed building.

The Axbridge Film Society is based at the cinema. In 2016 volunteers raised £5,000 for repairs to the cinema and plans have been drawn up for further refurbishment and the installation of new sound and projection equipment.

Church of St John
The 13th-century parish Church of St John is a grade I listed building.

Work on the current building began in the early 15th century, and grew from an earlier building dating back to about 1230. The church is built of limestone and decorated with Doulting stone, while the steps are an interesting example of dolomitic conglomerate, which is known as puddingstone. The statue on the east side is that of St John the Baptist. On the west side is a king — perhaps Henry VII, which would place it after 1485. The north-aisle ceiling retains some mediaeval painted panels, and amongst the carved bosses is the head of a Green Man, with leaves sprouting around his face. The nave roof is Jacobean and dates from 1636. Restoration was undertaken in 1888 by J.D. Sedding, who contributed the fine parclose screens.

Status of settlement

In contrast to the much larger settlement of Cheddar immediately to the south east that remains a village, Axbridge is a town. This apparently illogical situation is explained by the relative importance of the two places in historic times. While Axbridge grew in importance as a centre for cloth manufacture in the Tudor period and gained a charter from King John, Cheddar remained a more dispersed dairy-farming village until the advent of tourism and the arrival of the railway in the Victorian era.

Workhouse
The Axbridge Union workhouse was erected in 1837 on the south side of West Street in Axbridge. The Poor Law Commissioners authorised expenditure of £4,496 17s 6d on construction of the building, which was intended to accommodate 250 inmates. It was designed by Samuel T Welch, who was also the architect of workhouses at Wells and Clifton. By 1929 the workhouse had become officially known as Axbridge Poor Law Institution.

Events
On the Saturday of the first Bank Holiday weekend in May, the annual Somerset Showcase took place. This includes craft displays and market, farmers' market, entertainment, exhibitions and live music in the evening. September sees the annual Blackberry Carnival, Fair in the Square and Harvest Home, which was introduced in 2007. Other events throughout the year include the Progressive Supper and Santa in the Square. Since 2009, a Concert by Candlelight has been held in the Church of St John the Baptist to coincide with Earth Hour. 

Axbridge hosts a one the few remaining historical pagents in the UK  every 10 years. This started in 1967 in celebration of the opening of the bypass. The next pageant was in 1970 and there has been one every decade since then except the 2022 pageant which was dealyed until 2022 due to the Covid 19 pandemic. The pageant features a cast of 300 and charts the town's history in 15 spectacular scenes featuring battles, riots, fights, high drama and pathos with live music, horses and livestock, plus a train and vintage cars. The 2022 pagaent programme was expanded to be a small festival with live music in the evenings.  

Axbridge Cricket Club was established in 2004, and plays around 35 friendly matches per season. The club also enjoys an annual club tour and plays other friendly sides around the Somerset county.

The town holds a farmers' market each month in The Square on the first Saturday of each month.

Notable residents 

 James Heappey, MP for Wells (2015–present)

See also

 Cheddar Reservoir

References

External links

 Axbridge Town Council
 Axbridge Archaeological Survey
 

 
Towns in Sedgemoor
Mendip Hills
Civil parishes in Somerset
Market towns in Somerset